Micro Championship Wrestling (MCW) is a professional wrestling promotion primarily showcasing midget wrestling. The promotion was founded by former pro wrestler Johnny Attitude (Johnny Greene) and featured promotional videos by Hulk Hogan. Production for the show began in March 2011 in Tampa, Florida. The promotion debuted on American cable channel truTV on September 14, 2011, it averaged 1 million viewers per week and aired in 34 different countries.

Johnny Attitude died on June 12, 2018, at 53 years old.

Championships

MCW Championship

The MCW Championship is a professional wrestling championship owned and promoted by Micro Championship Wrestling (MCW). The championship was created and debuted on August 23, 2011, at an MCW live event.

The first champion is Stefan Wagner who won a Battle Royal.
Nearly a year later Meatball defeated Stefan Wagner to become the 2nd MCW Champ in history. He held the title for over a year until early September 2013. 
In early September 2013 the MCW Championship switched hands to Huggy Cub. Less than 6 months later Meatball would once again become Champion, and still holds the title today.

Roster

Male wrestlers

Female wrestlers

Alumni
 Jimmy Vegas
 Sarge

Other personnel

Referees

Management

References

External links

Micro Championship Wrestling at truTV

2010 establishments in Florida
Independent professional wrestling promotions based in Florida
Midget professional wrestling